Andrew John Walker (born 29 October 1971, Bradford, Yorkshire, England) is a former English cricketer.  Walker was a right-handed batsman, who bowled right-arm off break.

Walker represented the Yorkshire Cricket Board in three List A matches.  His debut List A match came against the Gloucestershire Cricket Board in the 1999 NatWest Trophy.  His final two matches came against Huntingdonshire and Yorkshire, both in the 2000 NatWest Trophy.  In his three List A matches, he scored 57 runs at a batting average of 28.50, with a high score of 30*.

References

External links
Andrew Walker at Cricinfo

1971 births
Living people
Cricketers from Bradford
English cricketers of 1969 to 2000
English cricketers
Yorkshire Cricket Board cricketers